The Washington County Courthouse is located in downtown Washington, Pennsylvania. It was listed on the National Register of Historic Places on July 30, 1974. It is designated as a historic public landmark by the Washington County History & Landmarks Foundation.

On April 14, 1980, during the Presidential primary, Vice President Walter Mondale visited the courthouse for a campaign rally, calling out Democratic foe Ted Kennedy.

See also 
 [National Register of Historic Places listings in Washington County, Pennsylvania]]
List of state and county courthouses in Pennsylvania

References

External links
[ National Register nomination form]

Beaux-Arts architecture in Pennsylvania
Buildings and structures in Washington County, Pennsylvania
County courthouses in Pennsylvania
Courthouses on the National Register of Historic Places in Pennsylvania
Frederick J. Osterling buildings
Government buildings completed in 1900
National Register of Historic Places in Washington County, Pennsylvania
Washington, Pennsylvania